The conoid ligament is the posterior and medial fasciculus of the coracoclavicular ligament. It is formed by a dense band of fibers, conical in form, with its base directed upward.

It is attached by its apex to a rough impression at the base of the coracoid process on the scapula, medial to the trapezoid ligament; above, by its expanded base, to the conoid tubercle on the under surface of the clavicle, and to a line proceeding medialward from it for 1.25 cm.

These ligaments are in relation, in front, with the subclavius and deltoid muscles; behind, with the trapezius.

References

External links
 

Ligaments of the upper limb